Augusts Annuss (27 October 1893 – 5 January 1984) was a Latvian painter. His work was part of the painting event in the art competition at the 1936 Summer Olympics.

References

1893 births
1984 deaths
20th-century Latvian painters
Latvian painters
Olympic competitors in art competitions
Latvian World War II refugees
Latvian emigrants to the United States
People from Liepāja
Burials at Forest Cemetery, Riga